The Democratic Progressive Party (DPP) is a political party in Malawi. The party was formed in February 2005 by Malawian President Bingu wa Mutharika after a dispute with the United Democratic Front (UDF), which was led by his predecessor, Bakili Muluzi.

History 
The DPP party is an offshoot of the United Democratic Front. The UDF was formed by Bingu wa Mutharika and Bakili Muluzi and came to power in 1994 under Muluzi. After Muluzi's two terms were over, Mutharika succeeded him as head of the party and nation.  However, Muluzi remained involved in running the party; therefore Mutharika formed his own party, the Democratic Progressive Party, in early 2005. Many UDF members defected to the new DPP party. The party and Mutharika won elections in 2009, and continued to rule the country.

Internal politics 
In October 2008, the DPP's national governing council unanimously chose Mutharika as the party's candidate for the May 2009 presidential election.

Rise of the PP 
Bingu wa Mutharika increasingly became controlling in the party. He began to groom his brother, Peter Mutharika, to be his successor. This led to a situation where he began to sideline his vice-president Joyce Banda due to her refusal to accept the move. Mutharika then kicked her out of the party. Therefore, the courts held that she was still the vice-president of the country even though she was not the vice-president of the party. Subsequently, Joyce Banda formed the People's Party. When Mutharika died in April 2012, Banda was still the Vice-President and thus succeeded Mutharika as President, leaving the DPP under Peter Mutharika in opposition.

1 August 2011 DPP politburo 
On 1 August 2011, Bingu wa Mutharika shuffled the leadership of the DPP. Bintony Kutsaira, who was secretary general of the party, was moved to the Office of the President and Cabinet and replaced by Wakuda Kamanga. Former finance minister Goodall Gondwe was named first vice-president, replacing Joyce Banda who was dismissed from the party in December 2010 for "anti-party activities". Following the death of President Mutharika, who was also party leader, the National Governing Council of the Party chose Peter Mutharika as the new Party President on 6 April 2012.

The new DPP politburo after the shuffle:

Regional Governors: 
 North: Ancient Nkhata
 Centre: Kalanzi Mbewe
 East: Yusuf Yusweja
 South: Noel Masangwi

DPP presidents 
 Peter Mutharika 2014–2020
 Bingu wa Mutharika 2004–2012

DPP members 
 Etta Banda
 Goodall Gondwe
 Catherine Hara
 Yunus Mussa
 Peter Mukhito
 Bingu wa Mutharika
 Uladi Mussa
 Kondwani Nakhumwa
 Yusuf Jonas

Electoral history

Presidential elections

National Assembly elections 

All above results come from election reports on the Malawi Electoral Commission website.

References

External links 
 

Liberal parties in Africa
Political parties in Malawi
Political parties established in 2005
2005 establishments in Malawi